Green Cross International is an environmentalist organisation headquartered in Geneva, Switzerland, founded by former Soviet leader Mikhail Gorbachev in 1993. Today, member organisations are in 30 countries. Its primary mission is to "respond to the combined challenges of security, poverty, and environmental degradation to ensure a sustainable and secure future".

History
Green Cross International was founded by former Soviet leader Mikhail Gorbachev in 1993, building upon the work started by the 1992 Earth Summit in Rio de Janeiro, Brazil. On 6 June 1992, the Rio Earth Summit delegates asked Gorbachev to establish Green Cross International, and around the same time, Swiss National Council MP Roland Wiederkehr founded “World Green Cross”, with similar aims. The two organisations merged in 1993, becoming Green Cross International, which was formally launched in Kyoto, Japan, on 18 April 1993.

In 1994, the first Green Cross National Organisations (GCNOs) joined GCI in The Hague, including Japan, the Netherlands, the Russian Federation, Switzerland, and the United States.

Mission
The initial concept envisaged an international body to provide assistance to countries in ecological trouble.

The organisation's stated mission is to:
"Respond to the combined challenges of security, poverty, and environmental degradation to ensure a sustainable and secure future";
"Promote legal, ethical and behavioural norms that ensure basic changes in the values, actions, and attitudes of government, the private sector, and civil society, necessary to develop a sustainable global community";
"Contribute to the prevention and resolution of conflicts arising from environmental degradation"; and
"Provide assistance to people affected by the environmental consequences of wars, conflicts and man-made calamities".

Interaction with other organisations
Other organisations are affiliated with GCI in 30 countries.

GCI holds these statuses:
Consulting body for United Nations Economic and Social Council
Consulting body for UNESCO
Admitted observer organisation with the United Nations Framework Convention on Climate Change
Admitted observer organisation with the Conference of the Parties to the United Nations Convention to Combat Desertification 
Cooperation with the UN Environment Programme/UN Office for the Coordination of Humanitarian Affairs Environmental Emergencies Section
Cooperation with UN-HABITAT
Cooperation with other international organisations

References

External links 

 Green Cross Australia

International environmental organizations
Mikhail Gorbachev
Organizations established in 1993
1993 establishments in Switzerland